60th Street station is an elevated rapid transit station on SEPTA's Market–Frankford Line, located at the intersection of 60th Street and Market Street in Philadelphia, Pennsylvania. The station straggles the line between two West Philadelphia neighborhoods, Haddington to the north and Cobbs Creek.

The station is also served by SEPTA bus routes 31 and 46.

History

From June 2006 to January 2007, the station was closed for rehabilitation as part of a multi-phase reconstruction of the entire western Market Street Elevated. The renovated station included new elevators, escalators, lighting, and other infrastructure, as well as a renovated brick station house. The station reopened in January 2007 but the work was not fully completed until June 18, 2007. The project resulted in the station becoming compliant with the Americans with Disabilities Act.

Station layout

There are two side platforms connecting to a station house on the northwest corner of 60th and Market streets. Two exit-only stairs descend to the east side of 60th Street.

References

External links

60th Street entrance from Google Maps Street View
Images at NYCSubway.org
Images at SubwayNut 

SEPTA Market-Frankford Line stations
Railway stations in Philadelphia
Railway stations in the United States opened in 1907
1907 establishments in Pennsylvania